The 99th Division(2nd Formation) was formed in October 1950 basing on the 2nd Security Brigade of Huadong Military Region.

In May 1952 the division was inactivated and reorganized as 2nd Irrigation Works Construction Division().

References

Infantry divisions of the People's Liberation Army
Military units and formations established in 1950
Military units and formations disestablished in 1952